Omar Al Khouja (born 1 March 2000) is a Libyan professional footballer who plays as a midfielder for the Libyan national team.

He debuted internationally on 1 September 2021, in a 2022 FIFA World Cup qualifier against Gabon in a 2-1 victory.

On 7 September 2021, Al Khouja scored his first goal for Libya against Angola in a 0-1 victory.

International goals

References

External links
 

2000 births
Living people
Libyan footballers
Libya international footballers
Al-Ittihad Club (Tripoli) players
Libyan Premier League players
Association football midfielders
2022 African Nations Championship players
Libya A' international footballers